The Mandarin Daily News (Gwoyeu Romatzyh: Gwoyeu Ryhbaw;  Zhuyin ㄍㄨㄛˊ ㄩˇ ㄖˋ ㄅㄠˋ) is a traditional Chinese children's newspaper published daily in Taiwan.  The main text of the articles is accompanied by Zhuyin (Bopomofo) phonetic script to aid identification of difficult characters. The project was founded on 25 October 1948.

See also
Mandarin Daily News Language Center
List of newspapers in Taiwan

External links
Mandarin Daily News

Newspapers published in Taiwan
Chinese-language newspapers (Traditional Chinese)
1948 establishments in China
Publications established in 1948